The Romariz Futebol Clube is a Portuguese football (soccer) club in the parish of Romariz, municipality of Santa Maria da Feira, the district of Aveiro.  The team currently plays in the first division of the district of Aveiro.  The team plays in the stadium called Campos dos Valos.  The team uses its equipments made by Lusocal.

The club was founded in 1976.

Football clubs in Portugal
Sport in Santa Maria da Feira
Association football clubs established in 1976
1976 establishments in Portugal